Michail Elgin and Evgeny Kirillov were the defending champions, but they chose to not compete together.
Elgin partnered up with Ilya Belyaev and Kirillov teamed up with Andrey Kuznetsov. They met in the semifinal and Elgin/Belyaev won 6–3, 4–6, [10–1].
This pair defeated Denys Molchanov and Artem Smirnov in the final 3–6, 7–6(6), [11–9].

Seeds

Draw

Draw

References
 Doubles Draw

Mordovia Cup - Doubles
Mordovia Cup
2010 in Russian tennis